Elephantback Hill is a mountain in Barnstable County, Massachusetts. Telegraph Hill is located south and of Elephantback Hill.

References

Mountains of Massachusetts
Mountains of Barnstable County, Massachusetts